John Putnam Demos is an American author and historian. He has written two books that discuss witch hunts and has discovered that one of his ancestors was John Putnam Senior, a member of the Putnam family that was prominent in the Salem witch trials.

Demos was awarded the prestigious Bancroft Prize for his book Entertaining Satan. He was awarded the 1995 Francis Parkman Prize for his book The Unredeemed Captive: A Family Story From Early America.

He retired in December 2008 as the Samuel Knight Professor of History at Yale University.

Demos lives in Tyringham, Massachusetts.  He graduated from Harvard University.

See also
Raphael Demos (father)

Works
 Entertaining Satan - Witchcraft and the Culture of Early New England, Oxford University Press, London, 1982 
 A Little Commonwealth: Family Life in Plymouth Colony
 The Unredeemed Captive: A Family Story from Early America  (Winner of the Ray Allen Billington Award)
 The Enemy Within: 2,000 Years of Witch-Hunting in the Western World
 Editor, Remarkable Providences
 Past, Present, and Personal: The Family and the Life Course in American History
 The Heathen School: A Story of Hope and Betrayal in the Age of the Early Republic

References

External links

21st-century American historians
American male non-fiction writers
American people of Greek descent
History of the Thirteen Colonies
Year of birth missing (living people)
Living people
Yale University faculty
People from Tyringham, Massachusetts
Harvard University alumni
Historians from Massachusetts
Bancroft Prize winners
21st-century American male writers